Quinn may refer to:

People
 Quinn (soccer) (born 1995), Canadian soccer player and Olympic gold medalist
 Quinn (given name)
 Quinn (surname)
 Quinn (musician)

Places in the United States
 Quinn, Kentucky, an unincorporated community
 Quinn, Michigan, a ghost town
 Quinn, Missouri, an unincorporated community
 Quinn, South Dakota, a town
 Quinn River, Nevada

Houses 

 Quinn House, San Francisco
 A. V. Quinn House, Evanston, Wyoming
 Masten-Quinn House, Wurtsboro, New York
 Quin House, nickname for Algonquin Club, Boston, Massachusetts

Other uses
 Mannok, formerly the Quinn Group, a business group in Northern Ireland
 Quinn Industrial Holdings, a building products enterprise composed of two businesses formerly in the Quinn Group
 Quinn School of Business, at University College Dublin, Ireland
 Quinn the Eskimo, a song written by Bob Dylan and first released by Manfred Mann

See also
 Quin (disambiguation)
 Quinns (disambiguation)
 Harley Quinn (disambiguation)